The 2001 Women's NORCECA Volleyball Championship was the 17th edition of the Women's Continental Volleyball Tournament, played by six countries from October 10 to October 14, 2001 in Santo Domingo, Dominican Republic. The United States won the gold medal over Cuba and qualified for the 2001 FIVB World Grand Champions Cup; the Dominican Republic was third after winning over the Mexican team. Puerto Rico withdrawed and was replaced by Costa Rica; Canada and Jamaica cancelled their participation because of the recent flying problems derived by the September 11 attacks.

Competing nations

Squads

Preliminary round

Group A

October 10

October 11

October 12

Group B

October 10

October 11

October 12

Final round

Semi-finals
October 13

Finals
October 14 — Fifth Place Match

October 14 — Bronze Medal Match

October 14 — Gold Medal Match

Final ranking

Individual awards

Most Valuable Player

Best Spiker

Best Blocker

Best Server

Best Digger

Best Setter

Best Receiver

Best Libero

Best Coach

References

 Results
 Awards (Archived 2009-05-28)

Women's NORCECA Volleyball Championship
N
N
Volleyball